Integrated Security Unit (ISU) is a joint-services infrastructure security unit created to secure major events in Canada. This administrative and operational entity was first created by the Royal Canadian Mounted Police (RCMP) in 2003.

Subsequently, another ISU was formed for the 2009 World Police and Fire Games. In 2010, the RCMP formed an ISU to coordinate security planning and operations for the 36th G8 summit in Huntsville and the 2010 G-20 Toronto summit.

2009 World Police and Fire Games

The 13th World Police and Fire Games were held in Metro Vancouver in the Summer of 2009. For the protection of international athletes and due to the presence of firearms in competition, importation of pharmaceutical products and other restricted articles under Canadian law, the BC2009WPFGISU was formed to integrate all regulatory function.

Its members included:
 Royal Canadian Mounted Police
 Canada Border Services Agency
 Vancouver Police Department
 Delta Police Department
 West Vancouver Police Department
 Abbotsford Police Department
 New Westminster Police Service

2010 Winter Olympic and Paralympic Games

The initial Integrated Security Unit was established in 2003. It was led by RCMP Chief Superintendent Bob Harriman until mid-2007 when Assistant Commissioner Bud Mercer was appointed to the Chief Operating Officer position.

As an RCMP (mainly by the RCMP "E" Division) initiative, it was headquartered at 11411 No. 5 Road in Richmond.

The Vancouver 2010 Integrated Security Unit (V2010 ISU or VISU) was initially started with a budget of $175 million CAD, the final expenditure was over $900 million. Private security cost $100 million.

The unit consisted of approximately 16,000 police, military and private security personnel. It consisted members of:

 4000 RCMP personnel
 1700 members of 120 police and law enforcement agencies across Canada including:
 Vancouver Police Department
 West Vancouver Police Department
 Victoria Police Department
 Central Saanich Police Service
 Saanich Police Department
 Delta Police Department
 South Coast British Columbia Transportation Authority Police Service (Transit Police Service)
 Nelson Police Department
 British Columbia Conservation Officer Service
 British Columbia Corrections Branch
 British Columbia Sheriff Services
 Canada Border Services Agency
 Canadian Security Intelligence Service
 Alberta Sheriffs Branch
 Ontario Provincial Police
 Sûreté du Québec
 Royal Newfoundland Constabulary
 Calgary Police
 Edmonton Police Service
 Taber Police Service
 Winnipeg Police Service
 Brandon Police Service
 Hamilton Police Service
 Saguenay Police
 St-Eustache Police Service
 Ottawa Police Service
 Toronto Police Service
 York Regional Police
 Peel Regional Police
 Waterloo Regional Police Service
 Stratford Police Service
 Service de police de la Ville de Montréal
 Nishnawbe-Aski Police Service
 Hanover Police Service
 West Grey Police Service
 5000 Canadian Forces
 4800 private security screeners (Contemporary International (United States), United Protection Security Group (Canada), and Aeroguard (Canada)),
 Canadian Avalanche Rescue Dog Association
 NORAD

The unit was scaled down to 750 local RCMP officers, 500 military personnel and less than 6000 private security personnel for the Paralympic Games.

2010 G8/G20 summits

The Toronto Police, Ontario Provincial Police, the RCMP, York Regional Police and the Peel Regional Police had formed an ISU for the 2010 G-20 Toronto summit, along with help from Canadian Forces.

Toronto Police and the OPP focused on providing policing at the G-20 summit site in downtown Toronto and immediate security zone. As for Pearson Airport, the Canadian Forces and Peel Police will focused their protection within the airport and areas around the airport perimeter. For the G8 Summit in Huntsville, the OPP, the RCMP and the Canadian Forces provided the main security coverage.

The 1600 out of town police units (non-GTA) in Toronto consists of:

 Calgary Police: 162
 Waterloo Regional Police
 Niagara Regional Police: 100
 Hamilton Police Service: 88
 Stratford Police: 5
 Barrie Police: ESU
 Service de police de la Ville de Montréal.

2015 Pan American Games, Toronto

The ISU was activated again for the 2015 Pan American Games and 2015 Parapan American Games held in the Greater Toronto Area. It consisted of 10 police units:

 Ontario Provincial Police
 Toronto Police Service
 Hamilton Police Service
 Durham Regional Police
 Peel Regional Police
 York Regional Police
 Niagara Regional Police
 Halton Regional Police
 South Simcoe Police Service
 Royal Canadian Mounted Police

Additional units included:
 Canada Border Services Agency
 Canadian Forces
 Canadian Security Intelligence Service

The OPP was the lead agency of the ISU for this event.

2018 G7 summit

An ISU was activated for the 2018 G7 Summit held in La Malbaie, QC. The RCMP was the lead agency and partnered with the following Agencies:

 Canadian Forces
 Sûreté du Québec
 Service de police de la Ville de Québec (Quebec City Police Service)
 Service de sécurité publique de Saguenay (Saguenay Police Service)

See also
 2010 G-20 Toronto summit protests
 Black bloc

References

External links
 2010 Olympics ISU Website
 Winter Olympics ISU on Twitter
 G-8/G-20 ISU website

2010 Winter Olympics
2010 Winter Paralympics
2015 Pan American Games
2015 Parapan American Games
2003 establishments in Canada
Royal Canadian Mounted Police
Security